Larry Glueck (born October 5, 1941) is a former professional American football player who played defensive back for three seasons for the Chicago Bears. Glueck played for Villanova and appeared in the 1961 Sun Bowl and the 1962 Liberty Bowl with Villanova.  He was selected by Chicago in the 3rd round of the 1963 Draft and was part of the Bears' 1963 NFL Championship team.

Coaching career
Glueck was the head football coach for Fordham University from 1986 to 1993, and had previously served as an assistant coach at Harvard, Penn, Villanova and Lehigh.

Head coaching record

References

1941 births
Living people
American football defensive backs
Chicago Bears players
Fordham Rams football coaches
Harvard Crimson football coaches
Lehigh Mountain Hawks football coaches
Penn Quakers football coaches
Villanova Wildcats football coaches
Villanova Wildcats football players
People from Norristown, Pennsylvania
Players of American football from Pennsylvania